Soundstage: Umphrey's McGee – Live is the third DVD release by American rock band Umphrey's McGee. It was recorded during the summer of 2007 in Chicago, Illinois for the PBS music series Soundstage.  The DVD includes 13 songs from the Soundstage performance and two additional bonus tracks from their 2008 New Year's run at the Auditorium Theatre in Chicago.

Track listing

Ocean Billy
Higgins 
Got Your Milk (Right Here)
Out of Order
Great American
The Bottom Half
Walletsworth
Believe the Lie 
Eat
Words
Morning Song
Alex's House
Glory

Bonus tracks
Made to Measure (with Joshua Redman on saxophone)
Wizard Burial Ground

Personnel
Brendan Bayliss: guitar, vocals
Jake Cinninger: guitar, vocals
Joel Cummins: keyboards, vocals
Ryan Stasik: bass
Kris Myers: drums, vocals
Andy Farag: percussion

2009 video albums
2009 live albums
Umphrey's McGee video albums
Live video albums